Straboe Grave Slab is a medieval grave slab and National Monument located in Straboe, County Carlow, Ireland.

Location

The grave slab is located outside the ruined Templeboy church, about 6 km (4 mi) southeast of Castledermot, and about 1.5 km (1 mile) north of the River Slaney. A holy well, castle, ringfort and spring are located nearby.

Description

The grave slab measures 1.8 x 0.4 x 0.2 metres. There is a Latin cross at the wider end and a Maltese cross inscribed at the narrower end., with v-shaped ends.

References

National Monuments in County Carlow
Medieval sites in Ireland